Jakob Bender (23 March 1910 – 8 February 1981) was a German footballer who played as a midfielder. In the 1930s, he was a squad member of Fortuna Düsseldorf, who in 1933 became German League champions.

Between 1933 and 1935, Bender played for the Germany national team. He was part of the squad selected for the 1934 FIFA World Cup.

External links
 

1910 births
1934 FIFA World Cup players
1981 deaths
German footballers
Germany international footballers
Fortuna Düsseldorf players
Association football defenders
Footballers from Düsseldorf